AI YoungBoy 2 is a mixtape by American rapper YoungBoy Never Broke Again. It was released on October 11, 2019, by Never Broke Again and Atlantic Records. It serves as a sequel to his 2017 mixtape AI YoungBoy. The mixtape was supported by the singles "Self Control" and "Slime Mentality". 

The mixtape debuted at number one the US Billboard 200 chart, earning 110,000 album-equivalent units in its first week, becoming YoungBoy's first US number-one album. The mixtape was certified platinum by the Recording Industry Association of America (RIAA) in September 2020 and double platinum in August 2022. On February 21, 2023, it was announced by the RIAA that every song on the album has been certified gold or higher.

Background and composition
On August 4, 2017, the first part of the "AI YoungBoy" series titled "AI YoungBoy" was released. It reached number 24 on the Billboard 200 and was certified Gold by the RIAA. On October 11, 2019, without any previous announcements, he broke the news about releasing "AI YoungBoy 2" on his social media. The tracklist contains 18 songs, including the single "Slime Mentality" which was released on September 1, 2019. It features guest appearances from rappers Quando Rondo and NoCap. The mixtape marks the first commercial release since his release from prison in August 2019. According to The Fader, the mixtape deals with "difficulties he's faced over the past year". Regarding the cover art, Joshua Espinoza of Complex concluded that it depicts "a clear reference to the constant headlines about his legal issues".

Commercial performance
AI YoungBoy 2 debuted at number one on the US Billboard 200 chart, earning 110,000 album-equivalent units (including 3,000 pure album sales) in its first week. This became YoungBoy's 12th chart entry and his first US number-one album. In its second week, the album dropped to number two on the chart, earning an additional 80,000 units. In its third week, the album dropped to number four on the chart, earning 64,000 more units. In its fourth week, the album climbed to number three on the chart, earning 62,000 units, bringing its four-week total to 316,000 units. On September 22, 2020, the mixtape was certified platinum by the Recording Industry Association of America (RIAA) for combined sales and album-equivalent units of over a million units in the United States. On August 4, 2022, it was certified double platinum.

Track listing
Track listing and credits adapted from Apple Music and Tidal.

Charts

Weekly charts

Year-end charts

Certifications

References

2019 mixtape albums
YoungBoy Never Broke Again albums
Albums produced by Mike Will Made It
Sequel albums